HMS Waterloo was a 120-gun first-rate ship of the line of the Royal Navy, launched on 10 June 1833 at Chatham.

Waterloo was cut down to an 89-gun 2-decker and converted to steam at Chatham 1 April 1859 – 12 December 1859. Following the loss of the modern 101-gun steam 2-decker  in 1861, Waterloo was renamed Conqueror in 1862. In 1864 she served on the China station under the command of Captain William Luard, and was paid off in 1866.

In 1877 she was renamed HMS Warspite and served as a training ship at Greenhithe/Woolwich.

She was destroyed by fire in 1918, with 250 boys embarked at the time. Three teenage boys later claimed to have started the fire deliberately. They were charged for the alleged act and ordered to three years' detention at a reformatory.

Notes

References

 Lambert, Andrew Battleships in Transition, the Creation of the Steam Battlefleet 1815–1860,  published Conway Maritime Press, 1984. .
 Lavery, Brian (2003) The Ship of the Line – Volume 1: The development of the battlefleet 1650–1850. Conway Maritime Press. .
 Lyon, David and Winfield, Rif (2004) The Sail and Steam Navy List: All the Ships of the Royal Navy 1815–1889. Chatham Publishing, London. .

External links
 

 

Ships of the line of the Royal Navy
Caledonia-class ships of the line
Ships built in Chatham
1833 ships
Ship fires
Shipwrecks of the River Thames
Maritime incidents in 1918